A ghost population is a population that has been inferred through using statistical techniques.

Population studies
In 2004, it was proposed that maximum likelihood or Bayesian approaches that estimate the migration rates and population sizes using coalescent theory can use datasets which contain a population that has no data. This is referred to as a "ghost population". The manipulation allows exploration in the effects of missing populations on the estimation of population sizes and migration rates between two specific populations. The biases of the inferred population parameters depend on the magnitude of the migration rate from the unknown populations. The technique for deriving ghost populations attracted criticism because ghost populations were the result of statistical models, along with their limitations.

Population genetics

In 2012, DNA analysis and statistical techniques were used to infer that a now-extinct human population in northern Eurasia had interbred with both the ancestors of Europeans and a Siberian group that later migrated to the Americas. The group was referred to as a ghost population because they were identified by the echoes that they leave in genomes — not by bones or ancient DNA. In 2013, another study found the remains of a member of this ghost group, fulfilling the earlier prediction that they had existed.

According to a study published in 2020, there are indications that 2% to 19% (or about ≃6.6 and ≃7.0%) of the DNA of four West African populations may have come from an unknown archaic hominin which split from the ancestor of humans and Neanderthals between 360 kya to 1.02 mya. However, the study also suggests that at least part of this archaic admixture is also present in Eurasians/non-Africans, and that the admixture event or events range from 0 to 124 ka B.P, which includes the period before the Out-of-Africa migration and prior to the African/Eurasian split (thus affecting in part the common ancestors of both Africans and Eurasians/non-Africans). Another recent study, which discovered substantial amounts of previously undescribed human genetic variation, also found ancestral genetic variation in Africans that predates modern humans and was lost in most non-Africans.

In 2015, a study of the lineage and early migration of the domestic pig found that the best model that fitted the data included gene flow from a ghost population during the Pleistocene that is now extinct.

See also
Ghost lineage

References

Phylogenetics